Giulia Enders (born 1990 in Mannheim) is a German writer and scientist whose first book Gut: The Inside Story of Our Body's Most Underrated Organ, has sold more than two million copies in Germany and that was published in English, French (more than one million copies sold), Italian, Spanish, Arabic and other translations in 2015.

Biography
Enders is  enrolled in the doctoral (M.D.) programme in gastroenterology at Goethe University in Frankfurt, Germany. In 2012, she won the first prize at the Science Slam in Freiburg, Berlin and Karlsruhe with her talk Darm mit Charme (Charming Bowels). This talk was also published on YouTube. Enders received the offer to write a book about this subject that has sat atop the German paperback charts shortly after the release in March 2014. The drawings for the book were made by her older sister Jill Enders. She appeared in the German talk-shows 3 nach 9 and Markus Lanz.

Darm mit Charme was published in March 2014; in July 2014, the editor Ullstein Verlag announced that 500,000 copies were sold. The rights for the book have been sold in 18 countries.

In her book, she explains the functions and the importance of the human gastrointestinal tract. She also criticises the excess of hygiene in society and its impact on the immune system (hygiene hypothesis).

She is currently working on her thesis about the topic Acinetobacter baumannii that can cause infected wounds, respiratory diseases and blood poisoning. She would like to become a gastroenterologist afterwards.

Awards 
 Heinz Oberhummer Award for Science Communication (2017)

Books 
  translated as Gut (2015) 
 Audiobook: Shortened version read by Giulia Enders, 229 minutes, 3 CDs, Audio Media, München 2014, .

Notes and references

External links 
 
 
 Giulia Enders: Das Darmrohr - Darm mit Charme (in German) Science Slam Berlin 2012 (YouTube Video, 13 Minuten).
 The Agenda with Steve Paikin: Gut Reaction, with Giulia Enders 29 May 2015.
 May 2016 TED talk IN Budapest: https://www.youtube.com/watch?v=HNMQ_w7hXTA
 Giulia Enders was awarded the first Helmut Fischer Prize for Science Communication at the German Museum in Munich 16.02.2016

21st-century German writers
1990 births
Living people
Scientists from Mannheim
21st-century German women writers
German medical researchers
German science writers